NGC 4570 is an edge-on lenticular galaxy located about 57 million light-years away in the constellation Virgo. NGC 4570 was discovered by astronomer William Herschel on April 13, 1784 and is a member of the Virgo Cluster.

Structure 
NGC 4570 has a nuclear disc that extends to a radius of about ~. In between the nuclear disk and the surrounding two stellar rings and the outer disk, there is a gap that separates the outer edge of the nuclear disk and the inner edge of the main disk by about  ~. This multi-disc structure may have been shaped through secular evolution induced by a small nuclear bar. However, observations of the globular clusters surrounding NGC 4570 have found a significant population with ages ranging from about 1–3 billion years. Surprisingly, the estimated ages of the young globular clusters appears to be in good agreement with the estimated age of the stellar population of the nuclear disc (≤2 Gyr). This suggests that the young globular clusters and the nuclear disc instead formed from a merger or accretion event which involved significant amounts of gas and triggered a strong starburst in the galaxy.

Globular Clusters 
About 120 globular clusters have been detected surrounding NGC 4570.

See also
 List of NGC objects (4001–5000)
 NGC 5866

References

External links

Virgo (constellation)
Lenticular galaxies
4570
42096
7785
Astronomical objects discovered in 1784
Virgo Cluster
Discoveries by William Herschel